Karl Gether Bomhoff (6 August 1842 –23 September 1925) was a Norwegian pharmacist, politician and Governor of the Central Bank of Norway.

Biography
He was born in Larvik. He graduated as pharmacist in 1863, and worked in Drammen and Trondheim, and then a period as chemist in Dresden, Germany. He was managing director of Trondhjems mekaniske Værksted 1875–1878. In 1883 was elected to the Trondheim city council.
in 1884 was elected to the board of Norges Bank, which at this time had its head office in Trondheim. He served as the first Governor of the Norges Bank  from 1893 to 1920. He was elected representative to the Storting for the period 1895–1897, from the Liberal Party.

References

1842 births
1925 deaths
People from Larvik
Governors of the Central Bank of Norway
Norwegian pharmacists
Liberal Party (Norway) politicians
Members of the Storting